The Southwest Kimberley clawless gecko (Crenadactylus rostralis) is a species of gecko endemic to Western Australia in Australia.

References

Crenadactylus
Reptiles described in 1978
Reptiles of Western Australia
Taxa named by Glen Milton Storr